Clarendon Entertainment (Oldco) was a New York City-based film production and distribution company that specialized in films and documentaries. Oldco was founded in 1998 by media entrepreneur Rodney Parnther and director Roderick Giles.

Productions
Oldco was best known for financing and producing well-crafted high quality 35 mm short films under the Urban S.L.A.M. (Short Live Action Movies) brand. Urban S.L.A.M. is a platform that introduces audiences to the work of a new generation of urban filmmakers. These films were generally well-crafted pieces that feature both established and emerging African American performers. The films have been official selections at prominent film festivals throughout the U.S. and have aired on cable networks owned by HBO, Showtime and BET. One of the shorts, The Tested, won the top prize at the 2006 Los Angeles International Short Film Festival, qualifying it for an Academy Award nomination.

Oldco distributed the Urban S.L.A.M. series in the home entertainment market as well as other titles under a multi-year agreement with Alternative Distribution Alliance (ADA), a unit of Warner Music Group. The series was presented as a collection of five to eight high quality short films with compelling segments in between films. Oldco also offered colleges and universities across the U.S. live programs built around selected documentaries for Black History Month, notably From Martin to Tupac: Political Assassinations. This program completed a successful tour in February 2009, which included screenings at USC, Fordham University, Carnegie Mellon (UMC), Wellesley and Ferris State.

In April 2007, Oldco released The Adventures of Teddy P. Brains: Journey into the Rain Forest, the critically acclaimed first episode of a 3D animated series aimed at children 5–8 years old. The series follows the exploits of 6-year old Teddy, an African-American boy with a love for learning, his cousin Tempest Wits and dog D'Artagnan as they travel around the earth and back in time on exciting missions.

In March 2008, Oldco released the award-winning documentary Who Killed Martin Luther King?, directed by Emmy award-winning John Edginton, on DVD for the first time.

In the summer of 2008 Shoebox Pictures went into production on the feature-length version of The Tested with Russell Costanzo once more at the helm and Melissa B. Miller producing. The feature-length version expands on the controversial themes of redemption, justice, and the cycle of violence and stars Aunjanue Ellis, Armando Riesco, Michael Morris Jr. and Frank Vincent.

In August 2012, a new company was incorporated in Delaware by the founders and assumed the name Clarendon Entertainment ("Newco"). After a significant capital raise, Newco is now focused on helping filmmakers and other content creators raise money for their projects, primarily through crowdfunding and Sec. 181 financing. Newco is currently based in Fort Lee, NJ. Oldco was dissolved and is no longer active.

Partial filmography

Features
 The Adventures of Teddy P. Brains: Journey into the Rain Forest (format: 3D animation/Runtime: 60 mins.) – directed by Julie Goldstein; created and produced by Joseph L. Lewis III and Eugene Haynes; animation by Artifact Pictures. (acquired exclusive home entertainment rights)
 Who Killed Martin Luther King? (format: Super 16 mm/Documentary/Runtime: 65 minutes) – directed by John Edginton; produced by Otmoor Productions Limited in association with the BBC; winner, 1991 Cable Ace Award – International Documentary Special; nominated, 1990 Emmy Award – Best Documentary (acquired exclusive home entertainment rights)

Short-form
 The Date (format: 35 mm/Runtime: 12 mins.) – directed by Roderick D. Giles; official selection at the 2001 Urbanworld Film Festival, 2001 Pan African Film & Arts Festival, 2002 San Francisco Black Film Festival (3rd Place winner); licensed to HBO from 2001–2003; aired on BET-J in August 2006; starring Wendell Pierce (HBO’s The Wire; Brown Sugar, Waiting to Exhale)
 Gully (format: 35 mm/Runtime: 13 mins.) – directed by Roderick D. Giles; official selection at 2002 Urbanworld Film Festival, 2002 Pan African Film & Arts Festival, 2002 Palm Springs International Festival of Short Film & 2004 H2O Hip-Hop Film Festival; starring Tyson Beckford (Biker Boyz), Shiek Mahmud-Bey (Night Falls on Manhattan) and Stu Large (The Best Man, Shaft)
 Shootout (format: 24pHD/Runtime: 8 mins) – directed by Roderick D. Giles; official selection at the 2004 Urbanworld Film Festival, 2005 NY International Latino Film Festival, 2006 San Francisco Black Film Festival & the 2006 Imagination Film Festival
 The Box Preacher (format: 35 mm/Runtime: 8 mins.) – directed by Alex Pikas; official selection at the 2004 Urbanworld Film Festival, 2004 Annapolis Film Festival & the 2004 Palm Springs International Festival of Short Film; features music licensed from Sweet Honey in the Rock and the Jimi Hendrix estate.
 The Marriage Counselor (format: 35 mm/Runtime: 17 mins.) – directed by Nzingha Stewart; official selection at the 2005 Urbanworld Film Festival & the 2006 Imagination Film Festival; starring Nichole Robinson (Love Don’t Cost A Thing, Torque, Showtime’s Huff; Maxim cover girl)
 The Engagement Party (format: 35 mm/Runtime: 19 mins.) – directed by Roderick D. Giles
 The Tested (format: Super16 mm/Runtime: 29 mins.)– directed by Russell Costanzo; winner “Best of Fest” 2006 Los Angeles International Short Film Festival; winner, Best Cinematography 2007 Vision Fest.
 Paper Chase (format: 24pDV/Runtime: 5 mins.) – directed by Roderick D. Giles
 Testify (co-financed) (format: Super 16 mm/Runtime: 15 mins.) – directed by Darius Clark Monroe; official selection 2006 Martha’s Vineyard Black Film Festival; starring Art Evans (Never Die Alone, School Daze, Soldiers Story) and Al Thompson (Love Don’t Cost a Thing)(acquired exclusive home entertainment and digital rights).
 For Eva (co-financed)(format: 24pDV/Runtime: 20 mins.) – directed by Fidias Reyes; official selection 2006 NY International Latino Film Festival.(acquired exclusive home entertainment rights)
 Stone Mansion (format: 24pHD/Runtime: 15 mins.) – directed by Jan Johnson Goldberger; official selection at 2004 American Black Film Festival, 2004 Urbanworld Film Festival, 2004 Hollywood Black Film Festival, finalist 2004 Showtime Black Filmmaker Showcase (acquired exclusive home entertainment rights)
 All You Can Eat (format: 16 mm/Runtime: 5 mins.) – directed by Tishin Padilla; winner 2004 Fade-Up Short Film Festival (acquired exclusive home entertainment rights)
 St. Paul (format: Super 16 mm/Runtime: 20 minutes) – directed by Francisco Ordonez; winner 2005 New York Latino International Film Festival (acquired exclusive home entertainment and digital rights)
 A Single Rose (format: 35 mm/Runtime: 19 minutes) – directed by Hanelle Culpepper; winner, Best Short Film, 2004 Hollywood Black Film Festival; winner, Outstanding Cinematic Achievement, 2003 Boston International Film Festival; official selection 2003 Palm Springs International Festival of Short Film, AFI Fest 2003, 2004 Cannes Film Festival (ICG Showcase) and 2005 FESPACO; (acquired exclusive home entertainment and digital rights).
 Midway (format: 35 mm/Runtime: 10 minutes) – directed by Darius Clark Monroe; official selection 2007 American Black Film Festival HBO Short Film Competition; official selection 2007 Palm Springs International Festival of Short Film; licensed to HBO 2008-2010(acquired exclusive home entertainment and digital rights); starring Albert Hall (Apocalypse Now; Malcolm X)
 Yellow (format: 24pDV/Runtime: 13 mins.) – directed by Dominga Martin; winner 2006 H2O Hip-Hop Film Festival (acquired exclusive home entertainment and digital rights)
 Train (format: 24pHD/Runtime: 8 mins.) – directed by Darius Clark Monroe; (acquired exclusive home entertainment and digital rights)
 Cookie (format: 24pHD/Runtime: 12 mins.) – directed by Francisco Ordonez; (acquired exclusive home entertainment and digital rights)
 Say Grace Before Drowning (format: 24pHD/Runtime: 19 mins.) – directed by Nikyatu Jusu; (acquired exclusive home entertainment and digital rights)

References

External links
 Official Website
 Facebook Fan Page
 IMDB Page
 Urban S.L.A.M.

Film production companies of the United States
Mass media companies established in 1998
Mass media companies based in New York City